Paul Josef Olsson (13 July 1972) is an American singer, most notable as being the lead singer for the Alan Parsons Live Project.  He has toured with various artists over his lifetime, including Rufus Wainright, Beth Orton, and Placebo.

Biography
He was born in Houghton, Michigan to a musical family. His father had a DMA in choral music and was an avant-garde 12-tone composer, A&R executive for Motown Records and later a professor at Michigan Tech; his mother was a music/voice major and schoolteacher. He started playing violin at age 6. PJ caught the attention of Columbia records, who in mid-2000 released the album Words For Living which received positive reviews in the United States. Olsson also made an appearance on the Late Show with David Letterman, and his song "Ready for a Fall" was included on the soundtrack album for the television show Dawson's Creek. 

In 2002, Olsson joined the Alan Parsons Live Project, becoming their lead singer. He has performed with many other notable acts, including Kid Rock, Muse, Train, Rufus Wainright, Iggy Pop, Beth Orton, Bob Geldof, Something Corporate, Ben Harper, Nelly Furtado, Placebo, and Michelle Branch. In 2007 Olsson teamed up with Salman Ahmad to record a remake of the Nick Lowe song, "(What's So Funny 'Bout) Peace, Love, and Understanding", as the theme to The CW television show Aliens in America.

Discography

Solo
 1998: P.J. Olsson
 1999: Words for Living
 2005: Beautifully Insane
 2007: American Scream
 2013: Lasers and Trees

with Alan Parsons
Studio albums
 2004: A Valid Path - vocals, programming 
 2019: The Secret - vocals on "Years of Glory"
 2022: From The New World - vocals, keyboards, programming, bass guitar

Live albums
 2010: Eye 2 Eye: Live in Madrid - acoustic guitar, vocals 
 2013: LiveSpan - vocals 
 2016: Alan Parsons Symphonic Project, Live in Colombia - vocals, guitar

Singles
 2010: All Our Yesterdays
 2014: Fragile
 2015: Do You Live at All

Compilation appearances
 1999: Songs from Dawson's Creek (various artists) - vocals on "Ready for a Fall"

References

External links
 

American male singers
Singers from Michigan
Living people
1969 births